Pioneers Park (also Pionierspark) is a suburb in the south of Windhoek, Namibia, in the Windhoek West parliamentary constituency. It was developed in the second half of the 20th century as a white community, with the previous black residents being expelled to Katutura. The suburb is mainly residential, but also contains the main campus of the University of Namibia. Other local facilities include a cemetery and the Catholic Church of St. Boniface, built in 1928, which is now a national monument.

References

External links
 www.windhoekcc.org.na
 Pioneerspark Neighbourhood Watch (PPNHW) - www.ppnhw.org

Suburbs of Windhoek